A series of restrictions on transit through Lithuania between the Russian semi-exclave of Kaliningrad Oblast and mainland Russia were implemented during the 2022 Russian invasion of Ukraine. The restrictions extended only to sanctioned goods and began on 18 June 2022. It was lifted one month later on 23 July.

History of the transit

Russia and Lithuania negotiated the simplified transit regime to Kaliningrad in late 1990s. Initially, Russia pushed for a right to have a military corridor, but Lithuania refused as it would breach the country's sovereignty. The agreement was signed and the simplified transit mechanism began operating on 1 July 2003, with Lithuania fully regulating the rules of the transit. When Lithuania joined the EU in 2004, it also joined the common policy on economic sanctions.

Timeline

June
The restriction was introduced on 18 June 2022, against as a sanction followed by the full-scale invasion of Ukraine by Russian troops.  Among other things, the transit of coal, metals, cement, wood, building materials and high-tech products by railway transport has stopped. The governor of the Kaliningrad Oblast, Anton Alikhanov, said that the ban affected 40-50% of cargo transported between the region and the rest of Russia. On June 21, Lithuania extended restrictions on freight vehicles as well.

In response, the Russian delegation began to openly threaten Lithuania. , the head of the temporary commission of the Federation Council for the protection of sovereignty, said:  Russia expressed an official protest to Lithuania.

On 22 June, the United States reminded that the NATO commitment to defend Lithuania is "ironclad".

The representatives of Lithuania stated that they are ready to Russia disconnecting it from the regional energy system. On June 24, the President of Lithuania Gitanas Nauseda said: 

On June 29, the head of the Committee of the Federation Council of the Russian Federation on International Affairs, Vladimir Dzhabarov, suggested that Russia could use military force against Lithuania.

Subsequently, the representatives of Germany said that they called on Lithuania to seek a compromise in order "not to provoke Russia". According to them, if the usual route for goods from the Russian Federation to Kaliningrad via Lithuania is not restored, Moscow may use military force.

July
On July 11, Lithuania expanded restrictions on the transit of goods, starting the phased introduction of sanctions announced by the EU. The list included concrete, wood, alcohol and alcohol-based industrial chemicals.

On July 13, the European Commission published an explanation for member states regarding the transit of goods from Russia to Kaliningrad, confirming the legality of Lithuania's actions. The Ministry of Foreign Affairs of Lithuania stated that they are following these recommendations and will check all goods as much as possible in order to make it impossible for the Russian Federation to violate the terms of the sanctions.

On 23 July Lithuania removed rail transit restrictions for Kaliningrad after EU revised its sanction recommendations that only apply to road transit and not rail.

See also 

 2022 Russia–European Union gas dispute
 2022 Russian debt default
 Kaliningrad question
 Karelia question
 Suwałki Gap
 International sanctions during the 2022 Russian invasion of Ukraine

References 

Kaliningrad Oblast
2022 in Russia
2022 in Lithuania
2022 in Europe
June 2022 events in Russia
July 2022 events in Russia
Events affected by the 2022 Russian invasion of Ukraine
Lithuania–Russia relations
Russia–European Union relations